Ram Lal Kureel was an Indian politician. He born Kureel Family. He was elected to the Lok Sabha the lower house of Indian Parliament from Mohanlalganj in Uttar Pradesh in 1977 as a member of the Janata Party. He was earlier a scientist in Solar energy working in Central Building Research Institute.

References

External links
 Official biographical sketch in Parliament of India website

1939 births
India MPs 1977–1979
Lok Sabha members from Uttar Pradesh
Janata Party politicians
Living people
People from Lucknow district